Rana Walker is an American mental health therapist and life coach.

Early life and education
Walker earned a Bachelor of Science in psychology from Howard University, and a Master of Education in Counseling Psychology from Temple University.

Starting Over
Walker starred on the reality television program Starting Over during its first Season (2004). She, and fellow life coach Rhonda Britten, assisted an ever changing group of six women in achieving their goals during their time in the Starting Over house.

The show's producers replaced Walker with Iyanla Vanzant for the second season of Starting Over. On her website, Walker expressed an accepting, peaceful attitude regarding her departure from the show.}

Health Cops:  Sentenced to Health

On-air talent for documentary mini-series, which aired over three years domestically and internationally on the Discovery Health Channel produced by Wall to Wall Productions (2001).
Starred as Health coach for an individual client over a 3-month period helping her improve her mind, body and spirit in every area of her life.

Additional resources
https://web.archive.org/web/20060503094953/http://www.diamondcutterllc.com/startover.html

American women psychologists
21st-century American psychologists
Participants in American reality television series
Howard University alumni
Temple University alumni
Year of birth missing (living people)
Living people
21st-century American women